"Hooray for Auburn!" (sometimes Hurrah for Auburn! or simply Hooray!) is the fight song of Auburn High School in Auburn, Alabama, United States.  The melody and basic wording of "Hooray for Auburn" have been adopted for use in the fight songs of many schools in the United States, including Hoover High School ("Hooray for Hoover") and Prattville High School ("Hooray for Prattville").

Lyrics

The lyrics to "Hooray for Auburn" are as follows:

Hooray for Auburn!
Hooray for Auburn!
Someone in the crowd is yelling "Hooray for Auburn!"
One, two, three, four!
Who you gonna yell for?
Auburn, that's who!

Korean translation
오번을위한 만세!
오번을위한 만세!
군중 속 누군가가 "오번을위한 만세!"
하나, 둘, 셋, 넷!
누구 한테 소리 지르 겠어?
오번, 저 사람이야!

Revised Romanization
Obeoneulwihan manse!
Obeoneulwihan manse!
Gunjung sok nugungaga "Obeoneulwihan manse!"
Hana, dul, set, net!
Nugu hante sori jireu gesseo?
Obeon, jeo saramiya!

When used by other schools, the lyrics are generally modified by changing the word "Auburn" to something else, such as the school name or mascot.

History

The basic lyrical structure of "Hooray for Auburn" comes from a cheer that was common in the mid-twentieth century. One of the earliest published versions of the cheer is in Lucile Hasley's 1953 book The Mouse Hunter. In 1961, Auburn High School Band director Tommy Goff wrote music for these lyrics after hearing the cheer used by the Auburn High cheerleaders at a junior varsity football game.  The song began being used as the Auburn High School fight song later that year.  Around 1963, LaFayette High School in LaFayette, Alabama began using the music as their fight song and soon after several other schools in eastern Alabama adopted "Hooray!".

Schools which use "Hooray!" as a fight song

The following schools use or have used a variation of "Hooray for Auburn!" as a fight song:

Anniston High School - Anniston, Alabama (Hooray for Bulldogs!)
Auburn High School - Auburn, Alabama (Hooray for Auburn!)
Benjamin Russell High School - Alexander City, Alabama (Hooray for Wildcats!)
Cherry Hill High School East - Cherry Hill, New Jersey (Hoorah for Cougars!)
Chilton County High School - Clanton, Alabama (Hoorah for Chilton!)
Eufaula High School - Eufaula, Alabama ("Hooray for Tigers!")
Glendale High School - Glendale, Arizona (Hoorah, for Glendale!)
Greenville High School- Greenville, Alabama (Hooray for Tigers!)
Helena Middle School - Helena, Alabama (Hooray for Huskies!)
Homewood High School - Homewood, Alabama (Hoorah for Homewood!)
Hoover High School - Hoover, Alabama (Hooray for Hoover!)
Luray High School - Luray, Virginia (Hurrah for Luray!)
Eustis High School - Eustis, Florida (Hoorah for Eustis!)
Miami High School - Miami, Florida (Hooray Miami!)
Monroe Academy -- Monroeville, Alabama (Hooray for Monroe!)
Opelika High School - Opelika, Alabama (Hooray for Bulldogs!)
Oxford High School - Oxford, Alabama (Hoorah for Jackets!)
Pell City High School - Pell City, Alabama (Hoorah for Panthers!)
Pine Forest High School - Pensacola, Florida (Hooray for Eagles)
Prattville High School - Prattville, Alabama (Hooray for Prattville!)
Reeltown High School - Reeltown, Alabama - (Hurrah for Rebels)
Richard J. Reynolds High School - Winston-Salem, North Carolina (Hoorah for Reynolds!)
Springfield High School - Springfield, Illinois (Hurrah! for Springfield)
Susquehanna Township High School - Harrisburg, Pennsylvania (Hurrah! for Indians)
Holtville High School - Holtville, Alabama (Hooray for Bulldogs)
Valley High School - Valley, Alabama (Hooray for Valley)
Simmons Middle School (Hoover, Alabama) (Hooray for Hoover)

Notes and references

External links
 Auburn High School
 Auburn High School Band

Auburn High School (Alabama)
Fight songs